Annouk van der Weijden (born 27 June 1986) is a former Dutch speed skater. Born in Leiderdorp, she competed at the 2014 Winter Olympics in Sochi, where she placed fifth in 3000 metres. She competed again at the 2018 Winter Olympics and finished fourth in 5000 metres.

Personal records

References

External links
 

1986 births
Living people
Speed skaters at the 2014 Winter Olympics
Speed skaters at the 2018 Winter Olympics
Dutch female speed skaters
Olympic speed skaters of the Netherlands
People from Leiderdorp
World Allround Speed Skating Championships medalists
Sportspeople from South Holland
21st-century Dutch women